Larangan is a district of Tangerang City, Banten, Indonesia.

Administrative Villages
The district of Larangan is divided into eight kelurahan or administrative villages:
Cipadu - area code 15155
Cipadu Jaya - area code 15155
Gaga - area code 15154
Kreo Selatan - area code 15156
Kreo – area code 15156
Larangan Utara – area code 15154
Larangan Indah – area code 15154
Larangan Selatan – area code 15154

References

Tangerang
Districts of Banten